Intense Tropical Cyclone Bejisa was a powerful tropical cyclone that affected the islands of Réunion and Mauritius in early January 2014. In late December 2013, a tropical disturbance developed to the north of Madagascar. With favorable conditions, the low developed into a disturbance and soon into a depression on December 28. The system continued to develop and intensified into Moderate Tropical Storm Bejisa on December 29, with rapid intensification occurring. Increased wind shear weakened the eyewall, which passed within  of Réunion. After having moved generally south-southeastward for much of its duration, Bejisa turned to the southwest on January 3, by which time it had weakened to tropical storm status. It became a post-tropical cyclone on January 5 after the convection weakened over the center, and Bejisa became extratropical the next day as it meandered southwest of Madagascar.

In its formative stages, Bejisa brought heavy rainfall to Seychelles, and it also dropped rainfall in Mauritius and Madagascar. Effects were worst on Réunion, where wind gusts were around  along the coast. The winds and rains downed many trees and power lines, which blocked roads and left 181,000 people without power. About 49% of the island also lost water supply. Bejisa left heavy damage to the agriculture industry, mainly to vanilla and sugar cane, totaling €62 million (US$84.8 million) in losses. The commune of Saint-Paul sustained moderate damage, with losses estimated at €3 million (US$4.1 million). Bejisa killed one person on the island due to head trauma, and there were 16 injuries. Later, the cyclone produced high waves in South Africa.

Meteorological history

In late December 2013, computer forecast models began to predict the development and cyclogenesis of a disturbance within the monsoon trough north of Madagascar. Accompanied by a low-level circulation center, the monitored storm complex developed rainbands about its southern periphery the following day. At 1200 UTC on December 28, Météo-France deemed the system sufficiently organized to be considered a tropical disturbance, the fourth system to be given such a classification by the agency that season. Upon its designation, the disturbance was analyzed to have an unusually high barometric pressure, based on nearby weather station observations. Météo-France projected for the system to peak as a tropical cyclone before slightly weakening and impacting the Mascarene Islands.

Tracking southward, the disturbance steadily organized following December 28. As a result of wind shear, the system's low-level circulation center remained partially exposed, though the shearing conditions were expected to lessen  At 0000 UTC on December 29, the disturbance was upgraded to a tropical depression. At 1800 UTC that day, the depression intensified to moderate tropical storm intensity, thus receiving the name Bejisa by the Mauritius Meteorological Services. This coincided with the improving satellite appearance of the storm's central dense overcast. Intensification subsequently quickened, and at 0600 UTC the next day Bejisa was considered to be a severe tropical storm. Concurrently a strengthening ridge in the mid-levels of the troposphere began to steer the storm towards the south-southeast. The agency noted that decreasing wind shear, favorable outflow, and warm sea surface temperatures allowed for the intensification.

The intensification phase of Bejisa was short-lived, as an eyewall replacement cycle resulted in a slight deterioration and fluctuation of the storm's organization and structure. On December 31, the system weakened below intense tropical cyclone status as the eye became less organized. When the eyewall replacement cycle completed, the eye became larger and the winds increased. However, increasing wind shear eroded the eyewall, which opened the eyewall in the northern periphery. That day, the storm's center passed within  of Réunion while continuing to the southeast, and the eyewall passed within  of the island. Continued wind shear stripped the convection, coupled with cooler water temperatures, and early on January 3, Bejisa weakened below tropical cyclone status. By that time, the ridge to the southeast turned the storm to the southwest. A slight decrease in wind shear was expected to allow the convection to rebuild on January 4, and the storm strengthened slightly. By January 5, Bejisa began evolving into a post-tropical cyclone, with weaker convection over the center. That day, Météo-France reclassified Bejisa as a post-tropical depression, noting that the radius of maximum winds had expanded. On the same day, the JTWC discontinued warnings after assessing that the storm had become a subtropical cyclone. Increasing wind shear displaced the remaining convection west of the center, and Météo-France discontinued advisories on Bejisa on January 6 after the exposed turned more to the south. The storm became extratropical and turned to the northeast, and was last noted on January 7.

Preparations and impact
Upon designation as a tropical disturbance, the predecessor to Cyclone Bejisa dropped heavy rainfall across the Seychelles. A weather station on Mahé observed  of rain over a 24-hour period beginning on December 27. The Farquhar Group were particularly affected, as the storm's incipient central region of convection remained over the area for an extended period of time.

The storm also produced heavy rainfall on Mauritius, reaching  at Sans Souci. Bejisa spawned a tornado in Grand-Gaube and Poudre d’Or. Rainfall and gusty winds also affected portions of Madagascar. Later, Bejisa produced high waves along the coast of KwaZulu-Natal in South Africa.

Réunion

In advance of the storm striking Réunion, officials advised residents to remain inside. Officials ordered residents in Saint-Leu along the coast to evacuate inland, and at least 300 people evacuated island-wide. The airport at Saint-Denis was closed, but reopened after the storm passed the island; several flights were canceled as a result. The main port was also closed, as were most childcare facilities, and mail service was suspended. Officials issued a red alert for the island, the first since Cyclone Dumile a year prior.

On Réunion, Bejisa produced strong wind gusts, averaging  along the coast, and peaking in Saint-Louis. The winds downed numerous trees and power lines, leaving an estimated 181,000 people without electricity, and closing roads due to debris. All eight of the island's high tension lines were affected. Thirty percent of cell phone service was temporarily lost due to the outages. Torrential rains impacted much of the island, with a 24-hour total of  measured at a volcano in Cilaos and  measured in a nearby town. The rains caused rivers to rise, resulting in flooding. About 49 percent of homes lost their water supply. Tremendous agricultural damage occurred across Réunion, with some areas reporting 80–100 percent losses. Damage in the sector reached €62 million (US$84.8 million) alone, mostly to sugar cane and vanilla. The commune of Saint-Paul sustained moderate damage, with losses estimated at €3 million (US$4.1 million). Approximately €1 million (US$1.4 million) of this stemmed from wind and water damage to homes; 121 residences qualified for relief aid. Along the coast, a pier was destroyed, several boats were damaged, and roads were impacted. One person died from head trauma while 16 people were injured in various incidents. Two of the injuries were severe due to falling off ladders while attempting to secure their homes during the high winds.

In the wake of Bejisa, Électricité de France (EDF) deployed 500 personnel and 6 helicopters to restore power on the island. Within three days, roughly 160,000 residences were restored, considerably faster than previous restoration efforts in previous cyclones. By January 9, all but a few dozen homes had power. In addition, water supply was largely restored within four days. A state of national disaster was declared for Réunion on January 17, by Overseas Minister of France, Victorin Lurel. This declaration covered 16 towns on the island: Les Avirons, Cilaos, L'Entre-Deux, L'Étang-Salé, Petite-Île, La Plaine-des-Palmistes, Le Port, La Possession, Saint-Joseph, Saint-Leu, Saint-Louis, Saint-Paul, Saint-Pierre, Salazie, Le Tampon, and Trois-Bassins. Insurance estimates indicated that €25 million (US$34.2 million) was needed for relief funding. Farmers were eligible for compensation under the disaster declaration; however, many voiced their skepticism following a lack of follow-through by the government to supply funds after Tropical Cyclone Dumile in January 2013. Ultimately, the affected farmers had to indicate their taxed losses by February 26 to receive the assistance. By April 2014, all farmers affected by the declaration were compensated.

See also

Cyclone Hollanda – struck Réunion in 1994
Cyclone Dina – struck Réunion in 2002

Notes

References

Bejisa
Bejisa
2014 in Mauritius
2014 in Réunion
Bejisa
Bejisa